A referendum on  joining the European Union was held in Poland on 7 and 8 June 2003. The proposal was approved by 77.6% of voters. Poland subsequently joined the European Union that year following the ratification of the Treaty of Accession 2003. The country's first European Parliament elections were held in 2004.

Question

Party policies
The governing Democratic Left Alliance and its junior coalition partner, the Labour Union, strongly campaigned for joining the EU. The biggest opposition party, the Civic Platform, was also strongly supportive of joining the EU. The agrarian Polish People's Party gave its support to the "Yes" campaign after its demands for the government were met in regards to farmers. The conservative Law and Justice party was openly critical of the EU's social agenda but ultimately supported joining the EU on economic grounds. The radical agrarian Self-Defence of the Republic of Poland was strongly Eurosceptic since its foundation but ultimately stayed neutral during the campaign. The far-right League of Polish Families was the only party in the Sejm which supported the "No" campaign.

Note: The table lists the political parties which were represented in the Sejm at the time of the referendum.

Results

References

Polish European Union membership
European
History of Poland (1989–present)
Referendums in Poland
Referendums related to European Union accession
Polish European Union membership
Polish European Union membership
Poland and the European Union
Polish European Union membership